George Bell (born 1957) is the tallest man in the United States at  as recognized by Guinness World Records. He was a deputy sheriff in Norfolk, Virginia, he played college basketball at Morris Brown College, Biola University with the Harlem Wizards and Harlem Globetrotters show teams.

Bell was featured on the AMC show Freakshow, throughout its two seasons. In an interview for the show, he revealed that he had appeared as an alien who landed on top of the L.A. Coliseum at the closing ceremonies of the 1984 Summer Olympics in Los Angeles. He also appeared on season 4 of American Horror Story. He first showed signs of his impending tallness when he was 9 or 10, Bell said, but through high school he never grew so tall that he felt out of place. By the time he hit his early 20s, however, his height had exceeded 7 feet. When he last measured himself, about 20 years ago, he said, he was 7 feet 7 inches. But the measurements for the Guinness book showed he had grown another inch. Bell said he has a medical condition called gigantism, which causes excessive growth hormone secretion during childhood. He said he does not suffer from some of the other effects of gigantism, such as an enlarged heart, although he does have to take some medicines for the rest of his life.

External links 
 "7-foot-8 Va. deputy used to ‘small man’s world’" from msnbc.com
 "Freakshow Q&A – George Bell"  from amc.com

1957 births
Living people
American deputy sheriffs
Biola Eagles men's basketball players
Harlem Globetrotters players
Basketball players from Norfolk, Virginia
People with gigantism
American men's basketball players